Craig Kevin Reid (born 17 December 1985) is an English footballer who plays as a striker. Reid started his career at Coventry City's youth academy in 2000, spending two years at the club before opting to join Ipswich Town in 2002. He spent two years at Ipswich, and then returned to Coventry, under a professional contract, in 2004. During his time at Coventry, Reid spent a month on loan at Conference National club Tamworth in March 2006. He was released by Coventry at the end of the 2005–06 season having not made a first-team appearance for his hometown club. In January 2007, Reid signed for Cheltenham Town and spent a year-and-a-half there before being released by the club in May 2008.

Reid signed for Conference Premier club Grays Athletic on a short-term deal in August 2008, before being loaned out to Newport County. Reid joined Newport on a permanent basis. He was the club's top goalscorer for three consecutive seasons, and helped Newport to promotion to the Conference Premier during the club's successful 2009–10 campaign. In January 2011, Reid signed for Stevenage for a fee of £90,000, making him the club's record signing. He helped the club earn promotion to League One during the 2010–11 season. In July 2012, Reid joined Aldershot Town for an undisclosed fee.

When Aldershot were relegated to the Conference at the end of the season, he had brief spells in the Football League with Southend United and Stevenage before spending the 2014–15 season with Kidderminster Harriers. Reid left Harriers by mutual consent early in the 2015–16 season, and then spent brief periods at various levels of non-League football with Brentwood Town, Lincoln City and Gainsborough Trinity. He signed for Gloucester City in June 2016. Reid returned to the Football League once again when he rejoined Newport County of League Two in January 2017, spending the second half of the 2016–17 season. He joined Coventry United in May 2017, before signing for Barwell on loan in January 2018. Reid left Coventry United at the end of the 2017–18 season.

Career

Early career
Reid started his career with home city club Coventry City in their youth academy, before moving to Ipswich Town's academy after a successful trial in April 2002. After two years at Ipswich, he rejoined Coventry, this time under a professional contract. He was the club's Young Player of the Year for the 2004–05 season, and was given another year's contract. In March 2006, Reid signed for Conference National club Tamworth on a month's loan deal. He made his first-team debut the next day, starting in the club's 2–0 loss to Ebbsfleet United at Stonebridge Road, and played one further game for the club, a 0–0 home draw against Southport. On his return to Coventry, at the end of the 2005–06 season, Reid was released, having not made any first-team appearances. In May 2006, Reid had an unsuccessful trial at Stockport County. Ahead of the 2006–07 season, he went on trial at Falkirk, and scored twice in their 2–1 friendly victory against Airdrie United in July 2006. Despite this, he did not earn a contract with the club. He also had another unsuccessful trial with Dundee in September 2006.

In January 2007, Reid signed for Cheltenham Town on a free transfer, signing a rolling monthly contract. He made his Cheltenham debut on 13 January 2007, coming on as a 76th-minute substitute in the club's 2–0 away loss at Huddersfield Town. He made a further five appearances for the club towards the latter stages of the 2006–07 campaign. In July 2007, Reid signed for Cheltenham on a permanent basis. He made a late substitute appearance in Cheltenham's first game of the 2007–08 season, playing three minutes in a 1–0 home win over Gillingham. Reid scored his first professional goal in Cheltenham's 3–1 away win against Swindon Town in the Football League Trophy. He made 12 appearances for Cheltenham during the 2007–08 season, scoring one goal. Reid was released by Cheltenham on 6 May 2008, having made 18 appearances for the club. Reid signed for Conference Premier club Grays Athletic on a one-year deal in August 2008, making his debut in a 1–0 home loss to Eastbourne Borough. He made two further appearances for Grays, before joining Conference South club Newport County on loan on 25 September 2008.

Newport County
Reid scored four times in ten league appearances during his loan spell at Newport, before signing for the club permanently on 19 December 2008. Reid scored his first senior hat-trick in Newport's 3–1 win against Chelmsford City in January 2009. He ended the season having scored 21 goals in 31 games in all competitions, 16 of which came in the Conference South. He remained at Newport for the 2009–10 season, and scored his first goal of the campaign in a 4–0 win against Chelmsford City. Reid was named as the Conference South Player of the Month after a run of seven goals in five matches in September 2009. Reid finished the 2009–10 season as Conference South top scorer with 24 goals for Newport who were champions with a record 103 points. He was named the Conference South Player of the Year. Reid signed a new two-year contract with Newport County on 17 April 2010.

Reid started in Newport's first game of the 2010–11 season, the club's first game back in the top tier of the non-League pyramid; they lost 1–0 to Darlington at the Darlington Arena on 14 August 2010. Three days later, he scored his first goal of the season, a 71st-minute penalty that earned Newport a point in a 1–1 draw against Tamworth. At the end of August 2010, Reid scored four goals in two games, scoring successive braces in games against Kidderminster Harriers and AFC Wimbledon respectively. During the January 2011 transfer window, it was reported that Reid had attracted interest from Premier League club Stoke City, as well as from his former employers, Coventry. Reid's last two goals for Newport came in the club's 3–2 defeat to Tamworth at The Lamb Ground, Dean Holdsworth's final game in charge of the club. Reid made his last Conference appearance for the club on 29 January 2011, in a goalless draw away at Histon in which he missed an 83rd-minute penalty. He scored 18 goals in 29 league appearances during the first half of the 2010–11 season. During his two-and-a-half-year stay at Newport, Reid scored 66 goals in 112 games in all competitions. Reid was inducted into Newport's Hall of Fame during the club's centenary evening on 27 October 2012.

Stevenage
Reid signed for League Two club Stevenage for an initial undisclosed fee on 31 January 2011; the fee was a record for both clubs, and Stevenage later stated that they paid £90,000 for the player. As part of the deal, Stevenage strikers Charlie Griffin and Yemi Odubade joined Newport on loan. Reid made his Stevenage debut in a 2–2 home draw with Accrington Stanley on 5 February 2011. He scored his first goal for the club in a 2–1 away win against Oxford United on 15 March, running onto Rob Sinclair's through pass to give Stevenage the three points. On the final day of the regular season, Reid scored Stevenage's second goal from the penalty spot in a 3–3 draw with Bury; the draw meant that Stevenage reached the play-offs thanks to a sixth-place finish. Reid started in all three of Stevenage's play-off games, including in the Final at Old Trafford against Torquay United, which Stevenage won 1–0 to gain promotion to League One. Reid made 23 appearances for Stevenage during the second half of the 2010–11 season, scoring twice.

Reid started the first competitive game of the 2011–12 season, on 6 August 2011, playing 70 minutes in a 0–0 draw at home to Exeter City, before being substituted for Byron Harrison. On his next appearance, ten days later, he scored the first goal of the campaign in a 3–1 away victory against AFC Bournemouth. Reid scored twice for Stevenage in a 4–2 home win against Rochdale on 3 September. His first goal, from Lawrie Wilson's knockdown, opened the scoring, and his secondStevenage's fourthwas widely reported as a Neal Trotman own goal, although it was attributed by Stevenage's website to Reid, who "managed to nip between the two defenders and just poke the ball into the net". His fourth goal in five games was Stevenage's first in a 5–1 victory over Sheffield Wednesday on 13 September 2011; he reacted quickest to a parried Michael Bostwick shot and scored from six yards out. He suffered a groin injury in November 2011 which required surgery, and he had a successful operation in January 2012. Reid returned to first-team action on 28 February, after three-and-a-half months out; he played the first 74 minutes of a 2–2 draw with Huddersfield Town. Reid went on to score goals in home victories against Brentford and Bury, with the latter strike coming in a 3–0 win that ultimately secured Stevenage's place in the play-offs. He made 34 appearances during the season, scoring seven times, as Stevenage narrowly lost in the play-off semi-finals. During his one-and-a-half-year spell at Stevenage, Reid made 57 appearances in all competitions, scoring eight times.

Aldershot Town
Ahead of the 2012–13 season, Reid signed for League Two club Aldershot Town for an undisclosed five-figure fee, later reported as a club record £75,000; the move reunited him with Aldershot manager Dean Holdsworth, who had previously managed Reid during his time at Newport County. He made his debut for the club on the opening day of the season, playing the whole match as Aldershot lost 7–6 on penalties to Wolverhampton Wanderers in the League Cup. Reid scored his first goal in his third appearance, in a 2–1 home defeat to Exeter City on 21 August 2012. Reid scored his first Football League hat-trick on 2 October 2012, although his goals could not prevent Aldershot from losing 4–3 to Torquay United at Plainmoor. He added a further three goals to his tally before the end of 2012, and opened the new year by scoring the winner from the penalty spot in a 1–0 victory away at Barnet, his tenth of the season. He ended the season with 12 goals from 45 appearances as Aldershot were relegated to the Conference.

Southend United
Although Aldershot did not initially release Reid, his contract was cancelled by mutual consent, and on 1 August 2013, he returned to League Two when he signed a one-year deal with Southend United. Southend manager Phil Brown stated that he hoped Reid would replace the goals scored by strikers Gavin Tomlin and Britt Assombalonga, both of whom had left. Reid made his Southend debut two days after signing for the club, on 3 August 2013, coming on as a 68th-minute substitute in a 1–0 win over Plymouth Argyle. All eight of Reid's appearances for Southend came in the opening three months of the season, of which six were from the substitute's bench, and he did not play for the club beyond October 2013.

Return to Stevenage
His contract with Southend was terminated by mutual consent on 25 February 2014, and Reid returned to League One club Stevenage. The move meant that Reid would be reunited with manager Graham Westley, who had signed the player for his first spell at the club three years earlier. He made one start and three substitute appearances without scoring, and was released at the end of the season.

Non-League
After leaving Stevenage, Reid signed a two-year deal with Conference Premier club Kidderminster Harriers on 15 May 2014. Reid made his Kidderminster debut on the opening day of the 2014–15 season, playing the first 64 minutes of the club's 0–0 draw away at Lincoln City. He scored his first goal for the club on 6 September 2014, opening the scoring in an eventual 2–1 victory against Gateshead at Aggborough. After scoring five times in 34 appearances during his first season, and not at all in the first month of the 2015–16 season, Reid left the club by mutual consent at the end of the transfer window.

Reid linked up again with Dean Holdsworth, this time at Isthmian League Premier Division club Brentwood Town in October 2015, where he spent a short spell before joining for Lincoln City of the National League. He was released after two appearances and moved on to Gainsborough Trinity of the National League North in January 2016. Reid finished the season with Gainsborough, scoring three goals from twelve league matches, and was one of six players released.

He signed for another National League North club on 6 June 2016, Gloucester City, managed by Tim Harris who was director of football at Newport when Reid was playing there. Reid made his debut for Gloucester in the club's first match of the 2016–17 season, playing the opening 84 minutes in a 1–1 draw away at Salford City. He scored once during his time there, in a 2–2 away draw with AFC Fylde, making 16 appearances during the first half of the season.

Return to Newport County
Having trained with the club prior to the official agreement, Reid rejoined former club Newport County on 6 January 2017. He signed for the club on a short-term deal under manager Graham Westley, the third time Westley had signed Reid. A day later, he made his second debut for Newport as a second-half substitute in a 3–1 defeat to former club Stevenage. He subsequently started Newport's next nine League Two matches, although did not appear for the club following Westley's sacking in March 2017. Reid was released by Newport in May 2017 having made 10 appearances during his second spell with the club.

Return to Non-League
Following his release from Newport, Reid returned to his home city to join Midland Football League Premier Division club Coventry United. He scored 14 times in 29 appearances for the club during the first half of the 2017–18 season, before signing for Barwell of the Northern Premier League Premier Division on loan on 19 January 2018. Reid made his Barwell debut in the club's 2–0 away win at Workington a day after signing. He scored his only goal for the club in a 1–1 draw with Ashton United on 17 February 2018, and went on to make nine appearances during his time there. He returned to Coventry United and finished the 2017–18 season playing in the club's first-team. Reid was not named in Coventry United's squad list ahead of the 2018–19 season as he began to focus on earning his coaching badges.

Style of play
Reid has been deployed as a striker throughout his career. Manager Graham Westley described Reid as a "good quality technician". After signing Reid for a third time, Westley stated "pace was never his main attribute which is why, four years on, I am comfortable that he can still play a role in what we do next.

Coaching career
Reid is a UEFA B Licence coach. He has been the head coach of the University of Warwick men's football team since September 2016.

Personal life
Reid was born in Coventry. He supports his hometown club, Coventry City.

Career statistics

Honours
Newport County
 Conference South: 2009–10

Stevenage
 League Two play-offs: 2010–11

Individual
 Conference South Player of the Year: 2009–10

References

External links
 (missing data from first spells at Stevenage and Newport County)
 (includes data from first spells at Stevenage and Newport County only)

1985 births
Living people
Footballers from Coventry
English footballers
Association football forwards
Coventry City F.C. players
Tamworth F.C. players
Cheltenham Town F.C. players
Grays Athletic F.C. players
Newport County A.F.C. players
Stevenage F.C. players
Southend United F.C. players
Aldershot Town F.C. players
Kidderminster Harriers F.C. players
Brentwood Town F.C. players
Lincoln City F.C. players
Gainsborough Trinity F.C. players
Gloucester City A.F.C. players
Coventry United F.C. players
Barwell F.C. players
National League (English football) players
English Football League players
Isthmian League players